Valori is a surname. Notable people with the surname include:

Bice Valori (1927–1980), Italian actress and comedian
Linda Valori (born 1978), Italian singer

See also
Valori (family), Italian family from Florence
Valori plastici, Italian magazine